The Basilica of St. Mary Star of the Sea is a Minor Basilica of the Catholic Church located in Key West, Florida, United States.    It is one of the oldest Catholic parishes in the state of Florida and the oldest parish in the Archdiocese of Miami.  The church is a contributing property in the Key West Historic District on the National Register of Historic Places.

History

The first Catholic presence in the Florida Keys was established on Upper Matecumbe Key by Spanish Jesuits in 1566.  The Jesuit superiors in Spain abandoned the Florida missions in 1572 and the missionaries were recalled to Mexico.  They attempted to establish a permanent mission on Key West as early as 1724. However, the Native peoples on the Keys were unpredictable and the English raiders from the Carolinas forced the missionaries to return to Cuba in 1727.  Two Italian Jesuits from Havana opened a mission chapel on Key West in 1743 for the Native peoples.  The Spanish governor ordered them to return to Cuba as well as he could not protect them.

The Rev. John F. Kirby was sent by Bishop Francis X. Gartland of the Diocese of Savannah to Key West in 1851 and established St. Mary Star of the Sea parish in 1851.  The first permanent Catholic Church on Key West was dedicated on February 26, 1852, on the corner of Duval and Eaton Streets.  It was the fifth Catholic parish established in the state of Florida and the first parish in South Florida. Because of its location between the Gulf of Mexico and the Atlantic Ocean it was placed under the patronage of Our Lady, Star of the Sea.  Rev. Anthony B. Friend, S.J. arrived in Key West as pastor on February 15, 1898.  He was the first many American Jesuits to serve the parish.

Five Sisters of the Holy Names of Jesus and Mary from Montreal, Quebec, Canada arrived in 1868 to open a school for girls and to establish a convent.  It is the first Catholic School in the state of Florida.  The sisters bought the present school property in 1874.  The Convent of Mary Immaculate, later known as Mary Immaculate High School, operated from 1886 to 1986, St. Francis Xavier School for blacks operated from 1872 to 1961, a school for Cuban girls operated from 1873 to 1878 and St. Joseph School for boys operated from 1880 to 1961.  All the schools were integrated in the 1960s.

The original church building was destroyed in a fire in 1901.  Until a new church could be built, Mass was celebrated in the convent music hall.  The present structure was built in 1905. The Jesuits ended their service to the parish after seventy-two years in 1970 and the Rev. Charles Zinn of Archdiocese of Miami became pastor.  St. Mary Star of the Sea Church was added to the National Register of Historic Places in 1971 as a contributing property in the Key West Historic District.  In 1983 the Sisters of the Holy Names of Jesus and Mary ended their service in Key West after 115 years.  The church was raised to a minor basilica by Pope Benedict XVI on February 11, 2012.

Architecture
The exterior of the church reflects the eclectic period of American Victorian Architecture.  It also shows elements of a modified, early Renaissance Revival style.  This may be found in the rusticated walls, rounded arches and lunettes that are composed of transitional gothic arches, louvered shutters and colored glass. Many interior elements have both Romanesque and early Renaissance characteristics. Behind the altar is a stained glass window that depicts the church's patroness.

School
The Basilica School of St. Mary Star of the Sea is the parish school. It was established in 1959 on the site of the former St. Joseph's School, for white male children, and St. Francis Xavier's School, for black children.

References

External links

Basilica of St. Mary Star of the Sea website

The Basilica School of St. Mary Star of the Sea

Religious organizations established in 1851
Roman Catholic churches completed in 1905
Star of the Sea, Key West
Buildings and structures in Key West, Florida
Roman Catholic churches in Florida
Roman Catholic Archdiocese of Miami
1851 establishments in Florida
Historic district contributing properties in Florida
Churches on the National Register of Historic Places in Florida
National Register of Historic Places in Monroe County, Florida
20th-century Roman Catholic church buildings in the United States